Nanjing Tech University (NJTech), colloquially known as Nan Gong (or Nangong, 南工), is a university located in Nanjing, Jiangsu Province, China. It is located 300 km from Shanghai. NJTech was part of the first group of universities approved by the Chinese Ministry of Education for the training of “Excellent Engineers.”  The university specializes in engineering. English language courses are compulsory.

History 
Nanjing Tech University has a history of more than one hundred years as a cradle of education. It is a key institution of higher learning to be constructed in Jiangsu Province, and one of the first group of institutions of higher learning approved by the Chinese Ministry of Education for the training of "Excellent Engineers". Nanjing University of Technology was established by merging the former Nanjing University of Chemical Technology and the former Nanjing Institute of Architecture and Civil Engineering in May 2001. The origin of Nanjing University of Chemical Technology can be traced back to Sanjiang Normal School established in 1902, which later changed to be National Central University in 1928 and Nanjing University in 1949, whose engineering departments formed Nanjing Institute of Technology by merging related engineering departments of several other universities in 1952 and then the chemical engineering department became Nanjing College of Chemical Technology in 1958 and renamed Nanjing University of Chemical Technology in 1995, and the origin of Nanjing Institute of Architecture and Civil Engineering was formerly the Department of Mechanics of Tongji Medical and Engineering School established in 1915. Nanjing University of Technology became a comprehensive university with engineering as its focus.
At the beginning of 2014, Nanjing University of Technology was renamed Nanjing Tech University.

Programs and facts 
Today, Nanjing University of Technology consists of two campuses, one in Mofan Road, and the other one in Jiangpu, covering a total area of 4000 mu (or ). The university has 26 colleges, and close to 30,000 students including overseas students, undergraduates, and master's degree and PhD candidates. It has 5 post-PhD stations, 35 PhD programs, 107 master's degree programs, 19 programs for Master of Engineering, and 80 undergraduate programs. And it has also become a university comprising eight branches of learning, namely, engineering, science, management, economics, liberal arts, law, philosophy, and medicine.

Staffs and research 
With a long history and a good tradition in education, Nanjing University of Technology boasts a good number of prominent and learned scholars. Of the 2,800 employees with the university's faculty and staff, there are more than 900 full professors and associate professors, including 1 academician of the Chinese Academy of Science, three academicians of the Chinese Academy of Engineering, two outstanding professional technical talents, two chair professors of Chang Jiang Scholars Program of the Ministry of Education, seven scientists-in-chief for the "National Key Development Program in Fundamental Research" (973 Program), seven chair professors of the “Thousand Talents Plan”, one member of the expert committee for 863 Program, seven winners of National Outstanding Youth Fund and 4 national distinguished teachers.

Nanjing Tech University has a strong contingent engaging in scientific research. In recent years, the university has undertaken 5,000 scientific research projects, including those of the 973 Program, the 863 Program, and the State Natural Science Foundation. A great number of its scientific achievements have won more than 100 awards at national, ministerial and provincial levels since the '11th Five-Year-Plan', including three Second National Awards for Scientific Progress and Technological Innovation, and 3 Second National Awards for Technical Innovation.

Schools and Colleges  
College of Safety Science and Engineering
School of Environmental Science and Engineering
College of Materials Science and Engineering
College of Chemical Engineering
School of Chemistry and Molecular Engineering
College of Electrical Engineering and Control Science
School of Mechanical and Power Engineering
School of Energy Science and Engineering
School of Pharmaceutical Sciences
College of Architecture
College of Art and Design
School of Economics and Management
School of Law
School of Marxism
School of Foreign Languages and Literature
School of Physical Education
College of Biotechnology and Pharmaceutical Engineering
College of Food Science and Light Industry
School of Computer Science and Technology
School of Physical and Mathematical Sciences
School of Geometrics Science and Technology
College of Urban Construction
College of Transportation Engineering
College of Civil Engineering
School of 2011
College of Overseas Education
Institute of Advanced Materials

Campus 
Today, Nanjing Tech University consists of two campuses, one in Mofan Road, and the other one in Jiangpu, covering a total area of 4000 mu (or 267 hectares). The main campus, Jiangpu, is located in Jiangpu District, north of Nanjing City and east of Zhujiang Town.

The university has 26 colleges, 70 disciplines and close to 30,000 students including overseas students, undergraduates, and master's degree and PhD candidates. The university offers undergraduate, Master's, and Doctoral degrees. It has 5 post-PhD stations, 35 disciplines for PhD programs, 107 master's degree programs, 19 programs for Master of Engineering, and 80 undergraduate programs. And it has also become a university comprising eight branches of learning, namely, engineering, science, management, economics, liberal arts, law, philosophy, and medicine. The university employs 2,800 teachers and staff. The university employs foreign teachers for language instruction.

Notable alumni 
 Min Enze (born February 1924), expert in petrochemical catalysis, academician of the Chinese Academy of Sciences and the Chinese Academy of Engineering.
 Liang Xiaotian (Chinese: 梁晓天; born July 1923), expert in organic chemistry and pharmaceutical chemistry, academician of the Chinese Academy of Sciences.
 Lou Nanquan (Chinese: 楼南泉; born December 1922), expert in molecular reaction dynamics and catalytic reaction, academician of the Chinese Academy of Sciences.
 Lu Wanzhen (Chinese: 陆婉珍; born September 1924), expert in petrochemical catalysis, academician of the Chinese Academy of Sciences.
Liu Bin (born March 29, 1974) Professor and Provost's Chair at the National University of Singapore, winner of the Royal Society of Chemistry Centenary Prize
 Hu Hongwen (born March 1925), expert in organic chemistry, academician of the Chinese Academy of Sciences.
 Chen Jiayong (Chinese: 陈家镛), expert in separation engineering, academician of the Chinese Academy of Sciences.
 Zhang Cunhao (Chinese: 张存浩; born 1928), chemist, academician of the Chinese Academy of Sciences and The World Academy of Sciences.
 Zhu Qihe (Chinese: 朱起鹤; born July 1924), expert in molecular reaction dynamics, academician of the Chinese Academy of Engineering.
 Shi Minxian (Chinese: 时铭显; April 1933 – September 2009), expert in petrochemical catalysis, academician of the Chinese Academy of Engineering.
 Jiang Dongliang (Chinese: 江东亮; born September 1937), vice president of Shanghai Institute of Ceramics, academician of the Chinese Academy of Engineering.
 Cao Xianghong (Chinese: 曹湘洪; born June 1945), chief engineer of Sinopec, academician of the Chinese Academy of Engineering and American National Academy of Engineering.
 Chen Yong (Chinese: 陈勇), president of Guangdong Academy of Science, Chinese Academy of Sciences.
 Xu Delong (born August 1952), president of Xi'an University of Architecture and Technology, academician of the Chinese Academy of Engineering.
 Tang Mingshu (Chinese: 唐明述; born March 1929), expert in cement, academician of the Chinese Academy of Engineering.
 Xu Nanping (Chinese: 徐南平; born April 1961), expert in ceramic membrane, academician of the Chinese Academy of Engineering.
Lu Wenyu, (Chinese: 陆文宇; born 1966), Architect and founder of Amateur Studio

References

External links 
Nanjing Tech University homepage

Universities and colleges in Nanjing